Tiantan Subdistrict is a subdistrict on the southwest side of the Dongcheng District, Beijing, China. As of 2020, it has a population of 27,429.

The subdistrict was named after Temple of Heaven, an imperial religious complex that is located in this area.

History

Administrative divisions 
As of 2021, there are 11 communities within the Tiantan Subdistrict:

Landmarks 
 Temple of Heaven
 Beijing Museum of Natural History

External links 
Official Website (Archived)

References 

Dongcheng District, Beijing
Subdistricts of Beijing